"Eagle" is a song that was recorded in 1977 by the Swedish pop group ABBA. It was the first track on the group's fifth album, ABBA: The Album, in terms of the album's sequence of songs, and the longest track they ever recorded (at 5:51, 1 second longer than "The Day Before You Came" at 5:50). The third and last official single from ABBA: The Album, it was released only in a limited number of territories as a single and in France as a double A-side with "Thank You for the Music." "Eagle" was not released as a single in the United Kingdom. It was intended to be a U.S. single, but was withdrawn.

History

"Eagle" was written and composed by Benny Andersson and Björn Ulvaeus, who provided its music and its lyrics respectively, as a kind of tribute to a band that the two men admired at the time, the Eagles. The recording, which commenced on 1 June 1977, had the working titles of "High, High" and "The Eagle." Lyricist Ulvaeus was inspired by Richard Bach's 1970 novel Jonathan Livingston Seagull when he wrote the lyrics for this song. In later years, music critics have hailed "Eagle" as one of ABBA's more outstanding tracks in terms of lyrics.

Reception
"Eagle" was not a major success on the charts. One reason was that the song was already available on ABBA: The Album; another was the limited release only in countries like Australia, Austria, Belgium (where it did top the charts), France, West Germany, the Netherlands and Switzerland. To make the song more radio-friendly it was heavily edited down from 5:51 to 4:25 by omitting an instrumental break and the third chorus. Australia and France got a further edit, with the song fading shortly after the 2nd chorus making it last just 3:33, 2:18 shorter than the album version. It was withdrawn as a single in the United States.

The single was released on 18 May 1978 to fill the gap between the previous single, "Take a Chance on Me" and the next, a completely new track, eventually titled "Summer Night City." The B-side of "Eagle," "Thank You for the Music", was later released as a single outright in a few countries after the group had disbanded, namely in the UK, where "Eagle" had not been released as a single.

Music video
The single was promoted with a music video directed by Lasse Hallström, while an earlier, much more interesting video in terms of special effects was included as a part of ABBA: The Movie.

1999 re-edit
The original 4:25 single edit was issued on CD for the first time in 1993 on the compilation More ABBA Gold: More ABBA Hits. However, for the 1999 re-release of this album, plus subsequent releases, a new version based on the 1980 edit was created. Unfortunately, this edit left out a vital instrumental-only section at the end of the second chorus prior to the closing instrumental, thereby sounding disjointed. The original edit—or at least an exact re-creation of it—was finally issued again on the deluxe version of ABBA: The Album in 2009.

Personnel
ABBA
 Agnetha Fältskog – lead and backing vocals
 Anni-Frid Lyngstad – lead and backing vocals
 Björn Ulvaeus – backing vocals, acoustic rhythm guitar
 Benny Andersson – backing vocals, keyboards
Additional personnel and production staff
 Janne Schaffer – lead guitar
 Lasse Wellander – lead guitar
 Rutger Gunnarsson – bass
 Ola Brunkert – drums
 Malando Gassama – percussion

Charts

Cover versions
 The Swedish ragga/dancehall artist Papa Dee recorded a cover of the song for the 1992 compilation ABBA: The Tribute.
 The English punk rock band Leatherface released a cover of the song as a single in 1992.
 The song was covered by ABBA tribute pop group Arrival on their 1999 album First Flight.
 The American Christian heavy metal musician Rob Rock recorded a rendition of the song for his 2000 album Rage of Creation.
 The song was covered by the German heavy metal band Sargant Fury on their 1993 album Little Fish and also included on the 2001 tribute album ABBAMetal, which was also released as A Tribute to ABBA.
 The Finnish rock band YUP included a cover of the song as a hidden track on their 2001 greatest hits compilation Hajota ja hallitse 1993–2001.
 The American indie-gospel band Danielson recorded a cover version on their 2009 7-inch single, "Moment Soakers."

Appearances in other media
 The original ABBA recording features in the film ABBA: The Movie, which was released in 1977.

References

1977 songs
1978 singles
ABBA songs
Music videos directed by Lasse Hallström
Number-one singles in Belgium
Polar Music singles
Songs about birds
Songs written by Benny Andersson and Björn Ulvaeus